Karl Thallinger (born 29 August 1909, date of death unknown) was an Austrian racing cyclist. He rode in the 1933 Tour de France.

References

1909 births
Year of death missing
Austrian male cyclists
Place of birth missing